Tam Kỳ station is one of the main railway stations on the North–South railway (Reunification Express) in Vietnam. It serves the city of Tam Kỳ.

Tam Ky
Railway stations in Vietnam
Buildings and structures in Quảng Nam province